North Kansas City is a city in Clay County, Missouri, United States. It is also enclaved in Kansas City. Even though the name is similar to its larger counterpart, Kansas City, it is an independent municipality part of the Kansas City metropolitan area. The population was 4,467 at the 2020 census.  Originally a northern suburb across the Missouri River from Kansas City, it is now almost completely surrounded by Kansas City, which has annexed far to the north of North Kansas City's northern city limits.  North Kansas City also adjoins the small municipality of Avondale.

Geography
North Kansas City is located at  (39.139007, -94.570518).

Transportation
Highways connecting North Kansas City with the surrounding area are Interstate 29/35/US 71, Missouri Route 1 (Vernon Street), Route 9 (Burlington Street), Route 210 (Armour Road), Route 269 (Chouteau Trafficway), and Route 283 (North Oak Trafficway). The US 169 (Broadway Extension) freeway runs immediately to the west of North Kansas City's city limits.

Four highway bridges connect North Kansas City with the portion of Kansas City, Missouri south of the Missouri River.  They are the Buck O'Neil Bridge on US 169, Heart of America Bridge on Route 9, the Bond Bridge on I-29/35/US 71, and the Chouteau Bridge on Route 269.  A fifth bridge to the west of the Heart of America Bridge, the ASB Bridge, originally carried road and rail traffic, but is now only a rail bridge. A dedicated bicycle/pedestrian path on the Heart of America Bridge opened in October 2010.

Demographics

2010 census
As of the census of 2010, there were 4,208 people, 2,361 households, and 878 families residing in the city. The racial makeup of the city was 76.8% White, 10.7% African American, 0.8% Native American, 3.3% Asian, 0.3% Pacific Islander, 4.7% from other races, and 3.5% from two or more races. Hispanic or Latino of any race were 11.5% of the population.

There were 2,361 households, of which 17.4% had children under the age of 18 living with them, 21.7% were married couples living together, 11.2% had a female householder with no husband present, 4.3% had a male householder with no wife present, and 62.8% were non-families. 53.2% of all households were made up of individuals, and 15.4% had someone living alone who was 65 years of age or older. The average household size was 1.78 and the average family size was 2.68.

The median age in the city was 39.9 years. 15.8% of residents were under the age of 18; 9.5% were between the ages of 18 and 24; 31% were from 25 to 44; 26.9% were from 45 to 64; and 16.7% were 65 years of age or older. The gender makeup of the city was 48.8% male and 51.2% female.

2000 census
As of the census of 2000, there were 4,714 people, 2,546 households, and 1,013 families residing in the city. The racial makeup of the city was 82.48% White, 3.97% African American, 0.59% Native American, 4.29% Asian, 0.23% Pacific Islander, 3.31% from other races, and 5.13% from two or more races. Hispanic or Latino of any race were 8.44% of the population.

There were 2,546 households, out of which 18.1% had children under the age of 18 living with them, 24.7% were married couples living together, 11.0% had a female householder with no husband present, and 60.2% were non-families. 51.1% of all households were made up of individuals, and 12.9% had someone living alone who was 65 years of age or older. The average household size was 1.85 and the average family size was 2.77.

In the city the population was spread out, with 18.0% under the age of 18, 12.7% from 18 to 24, 34.3% from 25 to 44, 20.9% from 45 to 64, and 14.1% who were 65 years of age or older. The median age was 36 years. For every 100 females, there were 94.1 males. For every 100 females age 18 and over, there were 92.2 males.

The median income for a household in the city was $28,674, and the median income for a family was $33,906. Males had a median income of $27,487 versus $26,591 for females. The per capita income for the city was $18,967. About 10.6% of families and 12.5% of the population were below the poverty line, including 21.7% of those under age 18 and 5.9% of those age 65 or over.

History 
A post office called North Kansas City was established in 1891. The town lies north of Kansas City, hence the name.

Large scale development of the area was not possible before the construction of levees protecting North Kansas City from flooding from the Missouri River. The levee on the north bank of the Missouri River was constructed between 1909 and 1912 and is owned and maintained by the North Kansas City Levee District. The city is also protected by a hillside levee.

The city was incorporated on November 4, 1912. A five-member board of trustees was elected in 1914 to oversee municipal affairs. One of the original trustees was William E. Macken, who was elected as the first mayor of North Kansas City in 1924. The city's largest park, Macken Park, is named for him.

The Armour Theatre Building, Sears, Roebuck and Company Warehouse Building, and Wheeling Corrugating Company Building are listed on the National Register of Historic Places.

In 2012 North Kansas City celebrated it Centennial with a citywide celebration.  As the city said goodbye to its first 100 years, it welcomed the next century with the opening of two micro breweries, a distillery and a new recreational opportunity called Pickleball.  These new businesses are building a younger clientele fueled by the repopulation of downtown Kansas City, just across the Missouri River.

Municipal government 
North Kansas City has a Mayor/Council/City Administrator form of government. Two council members are elected to two-year terms from each of the four wards. The mayor serves a four-year term. The current mayor, Bryant DeLong, was elected in 2021. Steve Fuller currently sits as Judge.

City services
The Fire Department has approximately 60 EMS personnel occupying two stations.  The police department has 41 sworn police officers and approximately 10 civilian personnel.  North Kansas City has its own hospital, library and park system. Macken Park is an approximate  park with a walking trail, running track, picnic shelters, playgrounds, lighted tennis and handball courts, baseball fields, soccer fields and basketball courts. Dagg Park, located east of City Hall features picnic tables, children's playground, spray park, and fountain. The North Kansas City Parks and Recreation Department offers an extensive list of programs and activities year-round. The city cooperates with local merchants in providing area residents and workers with entertainment events like Northtown's Noontime Friday in the Park concerts, parades and special displays.

Education

Primary and secondary schools
North Kansas City School District is the area school district. Most of the residentially-zoned areas of North Kansas City are zoned to Briarcliff Elementary School, while portions are zoned to Crestview Elementary School. All portions of NKC are zoned to Northgate Middle School and North Kansas City High School.

North Kansas City Library
North Kansas City Library, located at the southeast corner of 23rd and Howell, offers loans of books, magazines, video tapes, DVDs, and compact discs.  The library is run by the city and is not a part of the Kansas City Public Library or the Mid-Continent Public Library systems.

Healthcare
North Kansas City Hospital, founded in 1958, is a primary acute care center with 451 beds.

Infrastructure

Fiberoptic network 
liNKCity is one of the first municipally operated broadband networks in the state and provides speeds of up to 1 gigabit per second. For all residential citizens, it is free of cost and starts at 100 megabits per second. In 2005, the City of North Kansas City began construction of its own fiber optic network, and service began in 2006. In 2014, the City entered into an agreement for liNKCity to be managed by a third-party provider, DataShack.

Notable People
 Dan Lanning (b. 1986), head football coach for the Oregon Ducks

References

External links
 City of North Kansas City
 North Kansas City Police Department
 North Kansas City Hospital
 North Kansas City Public Library
 North Kansas City Schools
 Historic maps of North Kansas City in the Sanborn Maps of Missouri Collection at the University of Missouri

Cities in Kansas City metropolitan area
Cities in Clay County, Missouri
Missouri populated places on the Missouri River
1912 establishments in Missouri
Cities in Missouri